The 2019 AFC Asian Cup was an international football tournament that was held in the United Arab Emirates from 5 January to 1 February 2019. The 24 national teams involved in the tournament were required to register a squad with a minimum of 18 players and a maximum of 23 players, at least three of whom must be goalkeepers. Only players in these squads were eligible to take part in the tournament.

Before announcing their final squads, several teams named a provisional squad of 18 to 50 players; each country's final squad had to be submitted at least ten days prior to the first match of the tournament. Replacement of players was permitted until six hours before the team's first Asian Cup game. The AFC published the final lists with squad numbers on 27 December 2018.

The position listed for each player is per the official squad list published by AFC. The age listed for each player is as of 5 January 2019, the first day of the tournament. The numbers of caps and goals listed for each player do not include any matches played after the start of tournament. The nationality for each club reflects the national association (not the league) to which the club is affiliated. A flag is included for coaches that are of a different nationality than their own national team.

Group A

United Arab Emirates 
Coach:  Alberto Zaccheroni

The final squad was announced on 23 December 2018. Mahmoud Khamees was replaced by Al Hassan Saleh on 25 December. Rayan Yaslam was replaced by Mohammed Khalfan on 31 December due to injury.

Thailand 
Coach:  Milovan Rajevac (6 January 2019) / Sirisak Yodyardthai (from 10 January 2019)

The 27-man provisional squad was announced on 14 December 2018. The squad was reduced to 26 players on 26 December as Kawin Thamsatchanan was ruled out due to injury. The final squad was announced on 27 December 2018. Following the opening match, coach Milovan Rajevac was sacked and replaced by Sirisak Yodyardthai on 7 January 2019.

India 
Coach:  Stephen Constantine

The 34-man provisional squad was announced on 12 December 2018. The squad was reduced to 28 players on 19 December. The final squad was announced on 26 December 2018.

Bahrain 
Coach:  Miroslav Soukup

The 28-man provisional squad was announced on 7 December 2018. The final squad was announced on 27 December 2018.

Group B

Australia 
Coach: Graham Arnold

The final squad was announced on 20 December 2018. On 24 December 2018, James Jeggo was called up instead of the injured Aaron Mooy. On 2 January 2019, Martin Boyle was replaced by Apostolos Giannou due to injury.

Syria 
Coach:  Bernd Stange (6–10 January 2019) / Fajr Ibrahim (from 15 January 2019)

The final squad was announced on 23 December 2018. Bernd Stange was sacked and replaced by Fajr Ibrahim, following the team's loss to Jordan.

Palestine 
Coach:  Noureddine Ould Ali

The 28-man provisional squad was announced on 5 December 2018. The final squad was announced on 26 December 2018.

Jordan 
Coach:  Vital Borkelmans

The 29-man provisional squad was announced on 13 December 2018. The final squad was announced on 26 December 2018. Yazan Thalji was replaced by Ihsan Haddad on 5 January 2019 due to injury.

Group C

South Korea 
Coach:  Paulo Bento

The final squad was announced on 20 December 2018. Na Sang-ho was replaced by Lee Seung-woo on 6 January 2019 due to injury.

China 
Coach:  Marcello Lippi

The 25-man provisional squad was announced on 17 December 2018. The squad was reduced to 24 players on 26 December as Li Xuepeng was ruled out due to injury. The final squad was announced on 27 December 2018. Guo Quanbo was replaced by Zhang Lu on 5 January 2019 due to Zhang's recover from his injury.

Kyrgyzstan 
Coach:  Aleksandr Krestinin

The 35-man provisional squad was announced on 3 December 2018. The final squad was announced on 27 December 2018. Viktor Maier was replaced by Pavel Sidorenko on 2 January 2019 due to injury.

Philippines 
Coach:  Sven-Göran Eriksson

The final squad was announced on 27 December 2018. Paul Mulders was replaced by Amani Aguinaldo on 6 January 2019.

Group D

Iran 
Coach:  Carlos Queiroz

The 35-man provisional squad was announced on 10 December 2018. The squad was reduced to 34 players on 25 December as Saeid Ezatolahi was ruled out due to injury. The final squad was announced on 26 December 2018.

Iraq 
Coach:  Srečko Katanec

The 27-man provisional squad was announced on 4 December 2018. The final squad was announced on 27 December 2018. On 30 December 2018, Mahdi Kamel was replaced by Mohammed Dawood.

Vietnam 
Coach:  Park Hang-seo

The 27-man provisional squad was announced on 18 December 2018. On 25 December 2018, Lục Xuân Hưng was replaced by Hồ Tấn Tài due to injury. On 26 December 2018, the squad was reduced to 24 players. The final squad was announced on 27 December 2018.

Yemen 
Coach:  Ján Kocian

The 35-man provisional squad was announced on 4 December 2018. The final squad was announced on 27 December 2018.

Group E

Saudi Arabia 
Coach:  Juan Antonio Pizzi

The final squad was announced on 20 December 2018. Salman Al-Faraj was replaced by Nooh Al-Mousa on 6 January 2019 due to injury. Abdullah Al-Khaibari was replaced by Sultan Al-Ghanam on 7 January 2019 due to injury.

Qatar 
Coach:  Félix Sánchez

The 27-man provisional squad was announced on 12 December 2018. The final squad was announced on 27 December 2018. Ahmed Moein was replaced by Khaled Mohammed on 3 January 2019 due to injury.

Lebanon 
Coach:  Miodrag Radulović

The 27-man provisional squad was announced on 18 December 2018. The final squad was announced on 26 December 2018.

North Korea 
Coach: Kim Yong-jun

The final squad was announced on 27 December 2018.

Group F

Japan 
Coach: Hajime Moriyasu

The final squad was announced on 13 December 2018. Takuma Asano was replaced by Yoshinori Muto on 19 December 2018 due to injury. Shoya Nakajima was replaced by Takashi Inui and Hidemasa Morita was replaced by Tsukasa Shiotani on 5 January 2019 due to injury.

Uzbekistan 
Coach:  Héctor Cúper

The 27-man provisional squad was announced on 15 December 2018. The final squad was announced on 24 December 2018.

Oman 
Coach:  Pim Verbeek

The 26-man provisional squad was announced on 18 December 2018. Ali Al-Habsi was replaced by Ammar Al-Rushaidi due to an injury on 25 December 2018. The final squad was announced on 26 December 2018.

Turkmenistan 
Coach: Ýazguly Hojageldyýew

The 29-man provisional squad was announced on 20 December 2018. The final squad was announced on 27 December 2018.

Player representation

By age

Players
Oldest:  Zheng Zhi
Youngest:  Khaled Mohammed

Goalkeepers
Oldest:  Amer Shafi
Youngest:  Yusuf Habib

Captains
Oldest:  Zheng Zhi
Youngest:  Altymyrat Annadurdyýew

By club
Clubs with 5 or more players represented are listed.

By club nationality

By club federation

By representatives of domestic league

References

External links
 
 AFC Asian Cup UAE 2019 – List of Players

Squads
AFC Asian Cup squads